The Naypyidaw Water Fountain Garden is a garden in Naypyidaw, Myanmar. The  garden is situated near the Naypyidaw City Hall with a steel structure arch-way. The garden was set up near the Naypyidaw-Taungnyo Road.

See also
 National Herbal Park
 Naypyidaw Safari Park
 Naypyidaw Zoological Gardens

References
The New Light of Myanmar Volume XV, Number 265 published in Sunday 6 January 2008

Parks in Myanmar
Health in Myanmar
2008 establishments in Myanmar
Naypyidaw